A Second Knock at the Door is a documentary  on friendly fire in Iraq and Afghanistan.
The film follows military families after they are told their family member died in a "fratricide" incident.
All the families profiled in the film only learned their family member was killed by a comrade, not an enemy, months after they first learned of their death.

Director Christopher Grimes has described being inspired by the official coverup of former sport star Pat Tillman being killed by his comrades.

The film was screened at the Flyway Film Festival in 2011, and the East Lansing Film Festival in 2012.

Notes

External links

Documentary films about war
2011 films
2011 documentary films
Friendly fire incidents